Midnight Sun is an album of late-night jazz standards recorded by Herb Alpert. This was Alpert's final release of newly recorded music for A&M Records in 1992. It would also mark the 30th anniversary of A&M Records.

Featured tracks include "Friends" (an original composition featuring a duet with the late Sax legend Stan Getz recorded in 1990), as well as an orchestral arrangement of the hit "A Taste of Honey". Alpert offers two vocal efforts, "Someone to Watch Over Me", and a new version of "I've Grown Accustomed to Her Face". The album closes with "Smile", co-written by Charlie Chaplin, whose legendary lot became the home of the A&M Studios back in 1966.

Track listing

"Midnight Sun" (Lionel Hampton, Sonny Burke, Johnny Mercer) 6:05
"All the Things You Are" (Oscar Hammerstein II, Jerome Kern) 3:53
"Someone to Watch Over Me" (George & Ira Gershwin) 5:16
"In the Wee Small Hours" (Bob Hilliard, David Mann) 5:53
"Friends" (Eddie del Barrio, Herb Alpert) 4:21
"A Taste of Honey" (Bobby Scott, Ric Marlow) 6:52
"Mona Lisa" (Jay Livingston, Ray Evans) 5:46
"I've Grown Accustomed to Her Face" (Alan Jay Lerner, Frederick Loewe) 5:07
"Silent Tears and Roses" (Eddie del Barrio) 3:50
"Smile" (Charlie Chaplin, John Turner, Geoffrey Parsons) 4:13

Personnel
Herb Alpert – trumpet, vocals
Stan Getz – tenor saxophone
Larry Carlton, John Pisano, Barry Zwieg – guitars
Frank Collett, Eduardo "Eddie" del Barrio – piano
Monty Budwig – bass
Jeff Hamilton, Harvey Mason, Sr. – drums, percussion
Arranged and conducted by Eddie del Barrio
Strings sontracted by Bill Hughes

Production
Produced by Herb Alpert
Engineered by Steve Smith
Assistant engineers: John Aguto, Greg Goldman, Ed Goodreau, Eric Rudd, Thom Russo
Mastered by Bernie Grundman

References

Herb Alpert albums
1992 albums
A&M Records albums
Albums produced by Herb Alpert